The Karnak Flats is a historic apartment building located in the Lower West Side neighborhood of Buffalo, Erie County, New York, United States. It was built about 1898, and is a three-story, three bay, Colonial Revival style brick building. It sits on a stone foundation and full basement.  The building has four apartments per floor, for a total of twelve in the building.  The front facade features a metal balconette above the central recessed entrance and a two-story tripartite Palladian window with fluted Corinthian pilaster mullions.

It was listed on the National Register of Historic Places in 2016.

References

Residential buildings on the National Register of Historic Places in New York (state)
Colonial Revival architecture in New York (state)
Residential buildings completed in 1898
Buildings and structures in Buffalo, New York
National Register of Historic Places in Buffalo, New York